Parliamentary elections were held in Syria on 1 and 2 December 1961. The People's Party remained the largest party in parliament, winning 33 of the 172 seats.

Results

See also
List of members of the Parliament of Syria, 1961

References

Syria
Parliamentary election
Parliamentary elections in Syria
Election and referendum articles with incomplete results
Syria